VUF-6002 (JNJ-10191584) is a drug which acts as a potent and selective antagonist at the histamine H4 receptor. It has anti-inflammatory and analgesic effects in animal studies of inflammatory diseases.

See also 
 JNJ-7777120 (same molecule but where one nitrogen has been exchanged for a carbon)

References 

Benzimidazoles
Piperazines
Anti-inflammatory agents
Johnson & Johnson brands
H4 receptor antagonists
Carboxamides
Chloroarenes